Joshua "Josh" Nolz (born April 13, 1980 in Onancock, Virginia) is a former American midfielder.  He was a member of the United States national beach soccer team at the 2007 FIFA Beach Soccer World Cup.

Club
Nolz graduated from Nandua High School.  He attended Virginia Wesleyan College where he played on the men's soccer team from 1999 to 2002.  In 2003, he signed with the Mariners, but did not make a first team appearance until 2005.  That year, he played sixteen league games. In 2006, he continued with the Mariners, but never entered a game.  In 2007, Nolz moved to the Hampton Roads Piranhas where he played until 2008.

International
In 2007, Nolz played for the United States national beach soccer team at the 2007 FIFA Beach Soccer World Cup.  He continued playing for the national team through 2009.

References

External links
 

1980 births
Living people
American soccer players
Virginia Beach Mariners players
Virginia Beach Piranhas players
USL First Division players
USL League Two players
Association football midfielders
People from Onancock, Virginia
American beach soccer players